Julio César Cascante Solórzano (born 3 October 1993) is a Costa Rican professional footballer who plays as a centre-back for Major League Soccer club Austin FC.

Career
Following a career in his native Costa Rica with Orión, Universidad de Costa Rica and Deportivo Saprissa, Cascante signed with MLS side Portland Timbers on 2 January 2018.

Cascante was traded from Portland Timbers to MLS expansion side Austin FC in exchange for $250,000 in general allocation money on December 13, 2020.

Career statistics

Honours
Saprissa
 Liga FPD: 2016–17

References

External links
 
 

1993 births
Living people
Costa Rican footballers
Costa Rica international footballers
Deportivo Saprissa players
Portland Timbers players
Portland Timbers 2 players
Austin FC players
People from Limón Province
Association football defenders
Major League Soccer players
USL Championship players
Expatriate soccer players in the United States